The Ophiocistioidea is a class of extinct echinoderms from the Palaeozoic and early Mesozoic.

Ophiocistioids had a flattened dome-shaped body encased in a solid test of calcareous plates, similar to that of a modern sea urchin. The mouth was at the apex of the dome, and surrounded by a set of five jaws. The animals apparently did not have an anus, but a madreporite was on the upper surface, surrounded by what appear to be genital pores for the release of gametes.

Five ambulacra radiated outwards from the mouth across the upper surface, but did not extend onto the flat underside. Each had three unusually large tube feet at the margin of the dome. Unlike normal tube feet, these were covered in small bony scales, and therefore remain visible in fossils.

See also List of echinodermata orders.

References

 
Prehistoric deuterostome classes
Prehistoric Echinozoa
Ordovician first appearances
Carnian extinctions